Lauren Alissa Kaskie (born September 18, 1995) is an American soccer player who plays as a midfielder for Hammarby in the Damallsvenskan. She previously played for the Chicago Red Stars in the NWSL.

Youth career
Kaskie was an UCLA Bruin between 2013 and 2016, and earned Pac-12 All-Academic acclaim in 2015, as well as 2016. While in high-school, Kaskie played club soccer for LV Heat and had won three state titles with other teams.

Club career
Kaskie was drafted by the Chicago Red Stars with the 39th pick in the 2017 NWSL College Draft. She appeared in seven games for Chicago during the 2017 NWSL season.

On March 25, 2018, Kaskie made her 2018 season debut for Chicago in a 1–1 draw against the Houston Dash. Kaskie scored her first professional goal on April 18, 2018 against Houston Dash in 3–0 victory at Toyota Park.

On June 16, 2018 Kaskie was released by the Red Stars.

Kaskie signed with Hammarby in the Sweden Damallsvenskan on August 12, 2018.

References

External links

1995 births
Living people
National Women's Soccer League players
Chicago Red Stars players
Sportspeople from Las Vegas
Soccer players from Nevada
American women's soccer players
UCLA Bruins women's soccer players
Chicago Red Stars draft picks
Women's association football midfielders